Venyovsky District  is an administrative district (raion), one of the twenty-three in Tula Oblast, Russia. Within the framework of municipal divisions, it is incorporated as Venyovsky Municipal District. It is located in the northeast of the oblast. Its administrative center is the town of Venyov. Population: 33,940 (2010 Census);  The population of Venyov accounts for 44.9% of the district's total population.

References

Notes

Sources

Districts of Tula Oblast